Dara Dotiwalla (30 October 1933 – 30 January 2019) was an Indian cricket umpire. He stood in six Test matches between 1982 and 1987, including the second ever Tied Test, and eight One Day International (ODI) games between 1982 and 1988. He died on 30 January 2019, aged 85.

See also
 List of Test cricket umpires
 List of One Day International cricket umpires

References

1933 births
2019 deaths
Place of birth missing
Indian Test cricket umpires
Indian One Day International cricket umpires